City College station is an at-grade light rail station on the Blue Line of the Sacramento RT Light Rail system operated by the Sacramento Regional Transit District. The station is located in an exclusive right-of-way alongside the Union Pacific Railroad's Sacramento Subdivision and a small rail yard, on the campus of Sacramento City College, after which the station is named, in the city of Sacramento, California.

The station is located northeast of Charles C. Hughes Stadium on campus. In addition to serving the college this station also serves William Land Park and Curtis Park.

The land west of the station has been the site of transit-oriented development community named Crocker Village. The remediated brownfield land was formerly part of a larger Union Pacific rail yard. Early construction includes a bridge over the light rail platform and the remaining rail yard and a 91-unit senior housing development called Curtis Park Court.

Altamont Corridor Express and San Joaquins services are planned to stop at the station when those lines are extended to Sacramento. A new platform will be constructed along the main line to facilitate the commuter rail and inter-city trains. By 2023, the expected start of the new service was 2029.

Platforms and tracks 
Like nearly all stations built as part of the Blue Line Southwest Extension, City College station has a rather unique layout with an island platform serving northbound trains and a side platform boarding area for southbound trains, integrated into a plaza that leads into the Sacramento City College station. The southbound tracks are embedded in the pavement, allowing passengers to cross to the northbound platform from any point in the plaza. The layout is both efficient and a cost-effective way of providing a pedestrian-train interface.

References 

Sacramento Regional Transit light rail stations
Railway stations in the United States opened in 2003
Railway stations in California at university and college campuses
Future Amtrak stations in the United States
Future Altamont Corridor Express stations